Arthur Henry Walker (30 June 1833 – 4 October 1878) was an English cricketer.

Walker was born in Southgate and he was the fourth of seven cricket playing brothers - the Walkers of Southgate. He played first-class cricket as a right-handed batsman and a round-arm right-arm bowler for Marylebone Cricket Club (MCC) (1855–1861) and a Middlesex XI (1859–1862). He died in Arnos Grove, aged 45.

He was educated at Harrow School for whom he played cricket.

References

External links 
 Arthur Henry Walker at Cricinfo
 Arthur Henry Walker at Cricket Archive

1833 births
1878 deaths
English cricketers
Middlesex cricketers
People from Southgate, London
Marylebone Cricket Club cricketers
Gentlemen cricketers
Gentlemen of the South cricketers
Surrey Club cricketers
Gentlemen of England cricketers
Arthur Henry
Cricketers from Greater London
People educated at Harrow School